Stand Up is the sixth studio album by Dave Matthews Band, released on May 10, 2005. It was produced by Mark Batson. It was their fourth consecutive number one album on the Billboard 200. The album was the last to feature full participation from the band's saxophonist, LeRoi Moore, who died during the early production stages of the following album Big Whiskey & the GrooGrux King.

Background
In Fall 2004, DMB returned to their studio in Charlottesville, Virginia. Having decided they wanted to take some chances and pursue a funkier side to their music, A&R Bruce Flohr had tracked down a new producer in Mark Batson. According to Flohr in an interview with HitQuarters, "When the band and him got together it was instant creative karma. Things took off like a bat out of hell."

Release and promotion
Prior to the album's release, Dave Matthews Band published a website showcasing video clips from the production of the album with commentary by producer Mark Batson.  Additionally, VH1 streamed the album in its entirety before the official release.

The album is offered in CD format, DualDisc format (one side CD, one side DVD-Video), and as a digital download from the band's website or iTunes Music Store.  This was the first album by the band released for sale through iTunes.

Buyers have expressed their disappointment that some versions of Stand Up contain an anti-piracy program meant to keep the CD from being ripped, as this program prevents the CD from being played in some types of players; resultingly, the band posted instructions on how to circumvent the restriction on their website. The album artwork that appears on this CD depicts the Fire Dancer logo that Dave Matthews drew himself. It was created in response to someone asking him to capture what he saw when he looked out at the crowd during live performances.

Track listing
All songs by Dave Matthews Band and Mark Batson, except "Hello Again" by Dave Matthews Band.

Personnel
Dave Matthews Band
 Carter Beauford – drums, percussion (1, 2, 7, 11), vocals (2, 3)
 Stefan Lessard – bass guitar, guitar (14), vocals (3)
 Dave Matthews – vocals (1-3, 5-14), guitar (1-7, 9-14), piano (4, 8)
 LeRoi Moore – tenor saxophone (1, 3-5, 7, 9, 11-14), baritone saxophone (5, 7, 12, 13), soprano saxophone (1), vocals (3), pyrotechnics (5)
 Boyd Tinsley – violin (1-4, 9-11, 13, 14), electric violin (5, 7, 12), mandolin (7), vocals (3)

Additional musicians
 Mark Batson – piano (1, 2, 4, 6, 13), organ (5, 6, 10, 12, 13), keyboards (1, 3), Moog synthesizer (5, 14), Fender Rhodes piano (2), Mellotron (7), vocals (7), percussion (7), clavinet (10), synthesizers (11), Wurlitzer organ (12), string arrangements and conducting (1, 2, 7, 14)
 Ann Marie Calhoun – violin (1, 2, 7, 14)
 Sue Dench – viola (4)
 Lee Grove – additional percussion (1)
 Jennifer Myer – viola (1, 2, 7, 14)
 Leo Payne – violin (4)
 Audrey Riley – cello (1, 2, 4, 7, 14), string arrangements (4)
 Mira Stone – violin (1, 2, 7, 14)
 Butch Taylor – piano (1, 2), Fender Rhodes piano (7, 11), Wurlitzer electric piano (2, 10), organ (7, 9, 14), keyboards (1), background vocals (12, 14)

Technical personnel
 Mark Batson – producer, engineer (1-8, 10-14)
 Danny Clinch – photography
 Alex Dromgal – mixing assistant (1, 3, 10, 13)
 Dave Emery  – mixing assistant (1, 3, 10, 13)
 Rob Evans – assistant engineer (2-4, 6-14), engineer (1, 5)
 Aaron Fessel – engineer (4)
 Brian Gardner – mastering
 Serban Ghenea – mixing (2, 4, 5, 6, 7, 9, 11, 12, 14)
 Lee Grove – additional programming (1, 3, 10, 13)
 John Hanes – additional ProTools engineer
 Wyndsor Taggart Hug – art direction, design
 Thane Kerner – art direction, design
 Chris Kress – engineer
 Brian Malouf – additional pre-production
 Kevin Mahoney – assistant mixing 5, 6, 11, 12, 14)
 Tim Roberts – mixing assistant (2, 4, 5, 6, 7, 9, 11, 12, 14)
 Mark "Spike" Stent – mixing (1, 3, 10, 13)

Charts

Weekly charts

Year-end charts

References

External links
DMB New Studio Album website

Dave Matthews Band albums
2005 albums
Albums produced by Mark Batson
RCA Records albums